</noinclude>
"Dear John" is a single by MC Lyte featuring Common & 10Beats from her subsequent eighth solo album Legend.

The song seeks to give a positive message about maintaining a father-son relationship and also serves as the official anthem of #EducateOURMen, the scholarship arm of the MC Lyte foundation's Hip Hop Sisters Network. It chart on the real-time US Billboard + Twitter Trending 140, where it peaked  3, being Lyte's first solo work to appear on a chart since her album Da Undaground Heat, Vol. 1.

Content

The track is an open letter to men, asking, "You wanna be ballas, shot-callers, dippin 'in the Benz straight lawless?/Or, would you rather be fathers to your daughters, even though it's getting harder?".

Release and promotion
The song had a music video featuring a collection of photos ranging from dads spending time with their children, to images of black community pillars like Cornel West, W. E. B. Du Bois, Harry Belafonte, Bill Cosby, Arthur Ashe, B.B. King, Martin Luther King Jr., Malcolm X, Russell Simmons, and Jackie Robinson. In October 14, 2014, MC Lyte performed Dear John to President Barack Obama in the celebration of the 50th anniversary of the legislation that created the National Endowment for the Humanities and the National Endowment for the Arts.

Charts

References

2014 singles
MC Lyte songs
2014 songs
Songs written by MC Lyte